Miquel "Miki" Monrás Albanell (born 17 January 1992 in Barcelona) is a professional racing driver from Spain.

Career

Karting
Monrás began his motorsport career in karting back in 2002. In 2007, he was runner-up of the European KF2 Championship behind championship winner Will Stevens. He also made his debut in single-seaters in 2007, racing in Master Junior Formula.

Formula Renault
Monrás contested the Formula Renault 2.0 Italia Winter Series at the end of the 2007 season, where he was thirteenth. Monrás moved up to the Eurocup Formula Renault 2.0 and Formula Renault 2.0 West European Cup for the 2008 season, with the Hitech Junior Team. He finished 21st in the Eurocup standings, taking two points-scoring positions in fourteen races. In the West European Cup, he took eighth place in the championship, taking five points scoring positions in fifteen races, including a podium in the final race of the season at Valencia.

The following season, Monrás competed in both the Eurocup Formula Renault 2.0 and Formula Renault 2.0 West European Cup championships for SG Formula. He finished fifth in the Eurocup standings, taking eleven points-scoring positions in fourteen races, including podiums at Barcelona and two at Hungaroring. In the West European Cup, he took fourth place in the championship, scoring seven podium places.

GP3 Series
2010 saw Monrás move to the GP3 Series, competing for MW Arden, the team that is backed by Formula One Red Bull Racing's driver Mark Webber. He joined Michael Christensen at the team.

Formula Two
In 2011, Monrás moved again to the FIA Formula Two Championship. He achieved two podiums including one win at his first race weekend at Silverstone, taking pole position in the same race he won.

Racing record

Career summary

Complete GP3 Series results
(key) (Races in bold indicate pole position) (Races in italics indicate fastest lap)

Complete Formula Two results
(key) (Races in bold indicate pole position) (Races in italics indicate fastest lap)

References

External links
 Official site 
 Career details from Driver Database

1992 births
Living people
Spanish racing drivers
Italian Formula Renault 2.0 drivers
Formula Renault Eurocup drivers
Formula Renault 2.0 WEC drivers
Spanish GP3 Series drivers
Racing drivers from Barcelona
FIA Formula Two Championship drivers
Arden International drivers
SG Formula drivers
Cram Competition drivers
Epsilon Euskadi drivers